Halochromatium glycolicum is a bacterium from the genus of Halochromatium which has been isolated from microbial mats from the Solar Lake from Sinai in Egypt.

References 

Chromatiales
Bacteria described in 1997